Gilesia is a monotypic genus of flowering plants belonging to the family Malvaceae. It is also in the Byttnerioideae subfamily and it only contains one species, Gilesia biniflora F.Muell. It is commonly known as the 'western tar-vine'.

Its native range is central Australia.

It is named in honour of Christopher Giles (c. 1840 – 1917), an English surveyor, and Ernest Giles (1835–1897) an Australian explorer.
The specific Latin epithet of biniflora is derived from the Latin bīnus (“double, twofold”) and also 'flora' meaning plant.
It was first described and published in Fragmenta Phytographiae Australiae (Fragm.) Vol.9 on page 42 in 1875.

References

Malvaceae
Malvaceae genera
Plants described in 1875
Flora of Australia